The 3rd Army was a field army of the Red Army during World War II.

Polish Campaign
The 3rd Army was formed on 15 September 1939 from the Vitebsk Group of Forces, part of the Belorussian Front, which had been formed four days earlier from the Belorussian Special Military District for the Soviet invasion of Poland. The army was commanded by Komkor Vasily Kuznetsov. It included the 4th Rifle Corps with the 50th and 27th Rifle Divisions, in addition to the 5th Rifle Division, the 24th Cavalry Division, and the 22nd and 25th Tank Brigades. The units numbered 121,968 men and fielded 752 guns and 743 tanks on 17 September.

The 3rd Army saw its first action in September 1939, taking part in the operation in Belarus and Poland. The invasion was conducted under the terms of the Molotov–Ribbentrop Pact, which divided Poland between the Soviet Union and Nazi Germany and guaranteed that neither country would attack the other.

Order of Battle on 2 October 1939:

 10th Rifle Corps
 5th Rifle Division
 50th Rifle Division
 115th Rifle Division
 3rd Rifle Corps
 139th Rifle Division
 150th Rifle Division
 3rd Cavalry Corps
 7th Cavalry Division
 36th Cavalry Division
 15th Tank Corps
25th Tank Brigade

Eastern Front
After the start of Operation Barbarossa, it included three corps, including the 4th Rifle Corps (27th, 56th, and 85th Rifle Divisions), as well as the 21st Rifle Corps (17th, 24th, 37th and 50th Rifle Divisions) and 11th Mechanised Corps (29th and 33rd Tank Division and 204th Motorised Division).

The 3rd Army took part in the operations of the Western, Central, Bryansk during the defenses of Grodno, Lida, and Novogrudok.

During the second half of the Eastern Front, the 3rd Army took part in the Battle of Kursk, where numerically superior Soviet forces, using anti-tank defenses, defeated the German forces, thus stopping Operation Zitadelle and robbing the German Army of all hopes of victory on the Eastern Front. The 3rd Army took part in the Bryansk, Gomel–Rechitsa, and Rogachev-Zhlobin Offensives. During the final phases of the war, the 3rd Army took part in Operation Bagration, the East Prussian Offensive, and the advance into eastern Germany, where it participated in the Battle of Berlin.

On 1 May 1945 the 3rd Army consisted of the 35th Rifle Corps (250th, 290th, and 348th Rifle Divisions), 40th Rifle Corps (5th, 129th, and 169th Rifle Divisions), 41st Rifle Corps (120th Guards, 269th, and 283rd Rifle Divisions), 4th Corps Artillery Brigade, 44th Gun Artillery Brigade, 584th Anti-Tank Artillery Regiment, and other formations and units.

Post-World War II
The army headquarters was withdrawn to the Byelorussian Soviet Socialist Republic, where it was reorganised in August 1945 as the short-lived Headquarters Belorussian-Lithuanian Military District. The Belorussian-Lithuanian Military District, according to a Czech internet source (valka), existed 31 Dec 44 – 9 July 1945, whereupon it was succeeded by the Minsk Military District. By this time the army consisted of three Rifle Corps with nine rifle divisions. Later, all of them except the 120th Guards 'Rogachev' Rifle Division were disbanded.

The army was briefly reformed with headquarters at Slutsk when the Belorussian Military District was being reformed, under the command of Colonel General Nikolai Gusev from July 1946, but was again disbanded in March 1947.

Commanders
Vasily Kuznetsov (1 September 1939 – 25 August 1941)
Yakov Kreizer (25 August – 13 December 1941)
Pyotr Pshennikov (13–28 December 1941), killed in action
Pavel Batov (28 December 1941 – 11  February 1942)
Filipp Zhmachenko (11  February – 12 May 1942)
Pavel Korzun (12 May 1942 – 26 June 1943)
Alexander Gorbatov (27 June 1943 г. – 9 July 1945)

Notes

Citations

Bibliography

Further reading

External links
 Nafziger Collection, Combined Arms Research Library, Fort Leavenworth, KS.

003
Military units and formations established in 1939
Military units and formations disestablished in 1945
Military units and formations of the Soviet invasion of Poland